Post Gwyn is a subsidiary summit of Cadair Berwyn in north east Wales. It is the western outpost of the main central Berwyn range. The range also includes the Hirnantau to the west, which are crowned by Cyrniau Nod.

The summit is the highest bump on the most westerly of Cadair Berwyn's long south ridges. This ridge has a peat bog covering, with the heather being very deep. No well trodden paths have developed here and the summit is seldom visited.

The summit is marked by a pile of stones and offers views of Cwm Rhiwarth. The south ridge continues towards the summit of Glan-hafon, which at 608m is under 2000 ft.

References

External links
 www.geograph.co.uk : photos of Cadair Berwyn and surrounding area

Hewitts of Wales
Mountains and hills of Denbighshire
Nuttalls
Mountains and hills of Powys